Tomb KV1, located in the Valley of the Kings in Egypt, was used for the burial of Pharaoh Ramesses VII of the Twentieth Dynasty. Although it has been open since antiquity, it was only properly investigated and cleared by Edwin Brock in 1984 and 1985. The single corridor tomb is located in Luxor's West Bank, and is small in comparison to other tombs of the Twentieth Dynasty.

Tomb layout
Typical of tombs from this period, KV1 is laid out along a straight axis. The successors of Ramesses III constructed tombs that had followed this pattern and were all decorated in much the same manner as each other. It consists of four major parts: the entrance, a passageway, the burial chamber containing the sarcophagus, and a smaller room at the end.

Ramesses VII was in the seventh year of his reign when he died. There is evidence that the burial chamber was expanded from its original design as a corridor, and work on a subsequent room at the end of the tomb was halted.

The decoration within the passageway of the tomb contains illustrations from the Book of Gates, the Book of Caverns as well as the Book of the Earth. The walls of the burial chamber are decorated with extracts from the Book of the Earth. In terms of style and themes it closely follows that of its immediate predecessor, Ramesses VI's KV9, though the ceiling within the burial chamber contains a double image of the sky goddess Nut, reflecting a style used in tomb paintings used by pharaohs of the previous dynasty.

Within the burial chamber a depression has been cut into the rock, with an inverted box of stone shaped roughly like a cartouche placed over it. This is the last known example of a sarcophagus placed in a royal tomb, all subsequent burials consisting of deeper pits which were covered by a lid. The tomb was robbed in antiquity, and the mummy presumably lost, though four cups inscribed with the pharaoh's name were found in the "royal cache" in DB320 along with the remains of other pharaohs.

Visits in antiquity

The tomb was one of at least eleven tombs that were open to early travelers. As evidence of this, 132 individual graffitis left by Ancient Greek and Roman visitors have been counted throughout KV1. Later, the tomb was used as a dwelling by Coptic monks.

Early European visitors to the area included Richard Pococke, who visited KV1 and designated it "Tomb A" in his Observations of Egypt, published in 1743.

The savants accompanying Napoleon's campaign in Egypt surveyed the Valley of the Kings and designated KV1 as "1er Tombeau" ("1st Tomb") in their list.

Recent archeological work

Though not documented, the tomb was cleared in the 1950s. Starting in 1983, funded by the Royal Ontario Museum, Edwin Brock thoroughly excavated of the burial chamber floor, followed a decade later by an excavation of the tomb's entrance.  In 1994, the Supreme Council of Antiquities cleaned the walls and repaired cracks with plaster. In doing so, they covered over graffiti that had been left there in ancient times.

Some of Brock's findings included fragments of wood, calcite and faience shabtis, ostraca decorated with sketches presumably by the tomb's artists, a floral garland and numerous contemporaneous pottery shards.

References

Literature 
Hornung, E., et al. Zwei Ramessidische Königsgräber: Ramses IV. und Ramses VII, 1990, Mainz am Rhein, P. von Zabern.
Reeves, N & Wilkinson, R.H. The Complete Valley of the Kings, 1996, Thames and Hudson, London
Siliotti, A. Guide to the Valley of the Kings and to the Theban Necropolises and Temples, 1996, A.A. Gaddis, Cairo

External links

 Theban Mapping Project: KV1 Includes description, images and plans of the tomb.
 KV1 (Tomb of Ramesses VII) Includes detailed descriptions along with relevant photographs, images and plan of the tomb KV1.

Buildings and structures completed in the 12th century BC
Valley of the Kings
Ramesses VII
1980s archaeological discoveries
12th-century BC establishments in Egypt